Six women's teams competed in basketball at the 1976 Summer Olympics.

The following players represented Bulgaria:

 Nadka Golcheva
 Penka Metodieva
 Petkana Makaveeva
 Snezhana Mikhaylova
 Krasimira Gyurova
 Krasimira Bogdanova
 Todorka Yordanova
 Diana Dilova
 Margarita Shtarkelova
 Mariya Stoyanova
 Gergina Skerlatova
 Penka Stoyanova
 Head coach: Ivan Galabov

The following players represented Canada:

 Angela Johnson
 Anne Hurley
 Bev Barnes
 Beverley Bland
 Carol Turney
 Chris Critelli
 Coleen Dufresne
 Donna Hobin
 Joanne Sargent
 Joyce Douthwright
 Sheila Strike
 Sylvia Sweeney
 Head coach: Brian Heaney

The following players represented Czechoslovakia:

 Božena Miklošovičová
 Dana Ptáčková
 Hana Doušová
 Ivana Kořinková
 Lenka Nechvátalová
 Ľudmila Chmelíková
 Ľudmila Králiková
 Marta Pechová
 Martina Babková
 Pavla Davidová
 Vlasta Vrbková
 Yvetta Polláková
 Head coach: Jindrich Drasal

The following players represented Japan:

 Kazuko Kadoya
 Kazuyo Hayashida
 Keiko Namai
 Kimi Wakitashiro
 Kimiko Hashimoto
 Mieko Fukui
 Miho Matsuoka
 Misako Satake
 Miyako Otsuka
 Reiko Aonuma
 Sachiyo Yamamoto
 Teruko Miyamoto
 Head coach: Masatoshi Ozaki

The following players represented the Soviet Union:

 Angelė Rupšienė
 Tetiana Zakharova-Nadyrova
 Raisa Kurvyakova
 Olga Barysheva
 Tatyana Ovechkina
 Nadezhda Shuvayena
 Uljana Semjonova
 Nadezhda Zakharova
 Nelly Feriabnikova
 Olga Sukharnova
 Tamāra Dauniene
 Natalya Klimova
 Head coach: Lydia Alexeeva

The following players represented the United States:

 Cindy Brogdon
 Susan Rojcewicz
 Ann Meyers
 Lusia Harris
 Nancy Dunkle
 Charlotte Lewis
 Nancy Lieberman
 Gail Marquis
 Patricia Roberts
 Mary Anne O'Connor
 Patricia Head
 Juliene Simpson
 Head coach: Billie Moore

References

External links
 Official Report

1976